Odisha Mining Corporation Limited or OMC  is a Gold Category Public Sector Undertaking (PSU) established on 16 May 1956 as a joint venture company between Government of Odisha and Government of India to explore and harness mineral wealth of Odisha and make value addition. Odisha Mining Corporation is managed by a board of directors consisting of Government Directors and Independent Directors. The day-to-day management of the corporation is looked after by the chairman and the managing director as authorized by the board of directors.

History
1956: Odisha Mining Corporation Limited (OMC) was born on 16 May 1956 as a joint venture company of Government of Odisha and Government of India to explore and harness mineral wealth of the State of Odisha and make value addition.
1961: Subsequently, on 17 November 1961, OMC became a wholly State-owned Corporation of Government of Odisha.
2003: ISO 9001:2000 Certification
2005: Enterprise Resource Planning (ERP) Package as a Management Tool implemented for which Odisha Mining Corporation received Golden Peacock Award in 2006-07
2007: ISO 14001:2004 Certification
2012: The Odisha Mining Corporation Limited has been classified as a "Gold Category" State Public Sector Undertaking (PSU).

References

External links
 Official Website of Odisha Mining Corporation

Mining in Odisha
State agencies of Odisha
Companies based in Bhubaneswar
Mining companies of India
1956 establishments in Orissa
Government agencies established in 1956
Indian companies established in 1956